Salvia karabachensis is a species of sage, endemic to the Caucasus region. Like several other sage species, it is considered a medicinal plant. The species' specific epithet, karabachensis is derived from the Karabakh region.

References

karabachensis
Flora of the Caucasus
Karabakh